Birkigt may refer to:
Birkigt (Freital), a district of Freital, Germany
Marc Birkigt, a Swiss engineer